Tara Lewis may refer to:

Tara Lewis (actress) in The Sisterhood (TV series)
Tara Lewis (singer) on The Voice UK (series 3)
Dr. Tara Lewis, main character in Criminal Minds portrayed by Aisha Tyler.